FUO may refer to:

 Fuo, Ghana, a suburb of Tamale
 Federal University, Otuoke, in Nigeria
 Fever of unknown origin
 Foshan Shadi Airport in Guangdong Province, China